Carlino is an Italian surname. Notable people using this name include the following:

Joseph Francis Carlino (1917–2006), American politician
Lewis John Carlino (born 1932), American screenwriter and director

See also

Carlin (name)
Carlina (name)
Carline
Carling (given name)
Carlini (name)
Carlinos
Carlito (name)

Italian-language surnames
Patronymic surnames
Surnames from given names